The 1938 Women's Western Open was a golf competition held at Broadmoor Golf Club, the 9th edition of the event. Bea Barrett won the championship in match play competition by defeating Helen Hofmann in the final match, 6 and 4.

Women's Western Open
Golf in Colorado
Women's Western Open
Women's Western Open
Women's Western Open
Women's sports in Colorado